is an island in the Inland Sea of Japan and is considered part of the municipality of Kasaoka, Okayama Prefecture. It is one of six inhabited islands in the Kasaoka Islands, a chain of islands most easily reached from the port city of Kasaoka on Japan's main island, Honshū.

Geographics

Demographics

Shiraishi Island has a year-round, resident population of about 700 people.

Travel and Transport

Shiraishi can be reached by scheduled ferry service from Kasaoka.   There are a small number of cars and other vehicles on the island.

Culture

Education

Economy: Tourism, Fishing and Agriculture

Most of the resident men work as fisherman while many of the women work in vegetable gardens. In the summertime, Shiraishi Island is a popular tourist and weekend destination. Summertime visitors enjoy the island's sand beaches and the views out on the Inland Sea. The island is often visited by international visitors to Japan, partly because the government operates an inexpensive villa on the island exclusively for international visitors.

External links
Shiraishi Island Website *

Places of Scenic Beauty
Islands of Okayama Prefecture
Islands of the Sea of Japan